Pardosa nigriceps is a species of wolf spider in the family Lycosidae. This European spider is common on heaths and open spaces where there is low vegetation and bushes. The males have characteristically black palps due to a thick covering of hair. Males are 4-5mm in size the females are bigger at 5-7mm with a larger abdomen.

See also
 A list of other Pardosa species

References

External links
 British Arachnological Society: http://www.britishspiders.org.uk/nbn.php?spn=414

nigriceps
Spiders of Europe
Spiders described in 1856